Poonam Rani   v. State Of Uttar Pradesh   (2021) is a decision of the Allahabad High Court. The Court noted that the Constitutional Court has a duty  to monitor and observe the Constitutional morality as well as the rights of the citizens which are under threat only on account of the sexual orientation. The Court directed the appropriate Police Personnel to provide necessary protection and ensure that no harassment is caused to them.

Background 
The petitioners claimed that they are voluntarily living together on account of their sexual orientation. They are living in a "live-in-relationship" for a couple of years. They claimed that their relationship is facing resistance from the family members and the immediate society.

Judgment 
The court relied on the principles laid down by the Supreme Court of India in the Navtej Singh Johar v. Union of India case that any kind of discrimination based on the sexual orientation of a person is unconstitutional. In the case, Supreme Court ruled the sexual orientation is an intrinsic element of liberty, dignity, privacy, individual autonomy and equality, and the intimacy between consenting adults of the same sex is beyond the legitimate interests of the state. Additionally, the Court relied on the judgement in the case of Sultana Mirza v. State of Uttar Pradesh to make the ruling.  

The Court directed the appropriate Police Personnel to provide necessary protection and ensure that no harassment is caused to them.

See also 

 LGBT rights in India
 S Sushma v. Commissioner of Police (2021) 
 Sultana Mirza v. State of Uttar Pradesh (2020)
 Navtej Singh Johar v. Union of India (2018)

References

External links 

 

LGBT rights in India
Indian LGBT rights case law
2021 in case law
2021 in India
2021 in LGBT history
High Courts of India cases
Discrimination against LGBT people
Discrimination against LGBT people in India